Thomas M. Golden (November 1, 1947 – July 31, 2010) was a United States District Court Judge of the United States District Court for the Eastern District of Pennsylvania.

Education and career

Born in Pottsville, Pennsylvania, he received a Bachelor of Arts degree from Pennsylvania State University in 1969, and a Juris Doctor from Dickinson School of Law (now Pennsylvania State University - Dickinson Law) in 1972. He was in private law practice in Pennsylvania from 1972 to 2006.

Federal judicial service

On January 25, 2006, Golden was nominated by President George W. Bush to become a United States District Judge for the United States District Court for the Eastern District of Pennsylvania, to fill the seat vacated by Franklin Van Antwerpen. He was confirmed by the United States Senate on May 4, 2006, and received his commission on June 13, 2006.

Death

Golden died of cancer on July 31, 2010 in Reading, Pennsylvania.

References

External links

Thomas M. Golden Profile on Judgepedia

1947 births
2010 deaths
Dickinson School of Law alumni
Judges of the United States District Court for the Eastern District of Pennsylvania
Pennsylvania State University alumni
People from Pottsville, Pennsylvania
United States district court judges appointed by George W. Bush
21st-century American judges
Deaths from cancer in Pennsylvania